Vyacheslav Anatoliyovych Bazylevych, Vyacheslav Anatolevich Bazilevich (born 7 August 1990) is a Ukrainian-born Russian former football goalkeeper.

Honours 
2009 UEFA European Under-19 Football Championship: Champion

External links
Profile at official FFU website
Profile at footballfacts

1990 births
Living people
Sportspeople from Simferopol
Ukrainian footballers
Association football goalkeepers
Naturalised citizens of Russia
Russian footballers
Ukraine youth international footballers
Ukrainian footballers banned from domestic competitions
FC Shakhtar Donetsk players
FC Shakhtar-3 Donetsk players
FC Krymteplytsia Molodizhne players
FC Nyva Ternopil players
FC TSK Simferopol players
Crimean Premier League players
21st-century Ukrainian people